Kim Long is a commune (xã) and village in Châu Đức District, Bà Rịa–Vũng Tàu province, in Vietnam.

Populated places in Bà Rịa-Vũng Tàu province
Communes of Bà Rịa-Vũng Tàu province